Baron Botetourt is an abeyant title in the Peerage of England. It was created by writ of summons on 19 June 1305. It became abeyant in 1406, was recalled from abeyance in 1764 for Norborne Berkeley. However, it became abeyant again on his death in 1770. It was recalled a second time in 1803 for the 5th Duke of Beaufort, and became a subsidiary title of the dukes of Beaufort until the death of the 10th Duke in 1984, when it became, and remains, abeyant.

In Virginia 
Known and remembered in the American state of Virginia as "Lord Botetourt", Norborne Berkeley, 4th Baron Botetourt was governor of the Colony of Virginia from 1768 to 1770 and a member of Board of Visitors of the College of William & Mary at the capital of the Colony in Williamsburg, Virginia. Before coming to Virginia he was (as Norborne Berkeley) Member of Parliament for Gloucestershire 1741–1763. He then obtained his peerage, when it was called out of abeyance in 1764, the third holder of the title having died in 1406.

As governor, Lord Botetourt resided in the Governor's Palace near Duke of Gloucester Street, now a major attraction of Colonial Williamsburg in the Historic Triangle. Although a popular governor, Lord Botetourt served only two years. He died suddenly while still in office in 1770 and was buried in the crypt beneath the chapel of the Wren Building. Following his death a statue was commissioned and placed on the piazza of the Capitol building. Later it was moved, and the statue stood for many years in front of the Wren Building before being relocated once again to a more sheltered location within the ground floor of Earl Gregg Swem Library. A full-size facsimile stands in its place, one of the more familiar of campus icons.  Nowadays, William & Mary students dress up the statue for various occasions such as Charter Day (February 8).

Botetourt County, Virginia, was named in his honor, as was Berkeley County, which became part of West Virginia at the time of the American Civil War.  A lifelong bachelor, he endowed an award at the College of William and Mary that is still known as the Botetourt Medal; it is the College's most prestigious award. The medal was awarded to two students a year from 1772 to 1775, one in Classics and one in the Physical or Metaphysical Sciences. The medal was not awarded again until 1941, and has been awarded to one student each year since then.  It is awarded to the "single undergraduate with the greatest distinction in scholarship" on Commencement Day each May. Lord Botetourt High School, located in Botetourt County, Virginia is named after him as well. Additionally, Botetourt Street and Botetourt Gardens, both located in Norfolk, Virginia are also named after him.

Barons Botetourt (1305) 

 John Botetourt, 1st Baron Botetourt (d. 1324)
 John Botetourt, 2nd Baron Botetourt (d. 1385), grandson
 Joan Burnell, 3rd Baroness Botetourt (d. January 1, 1406)
 abeyant until 13 April 1764
 Norborne Berkeley, 4th Baron Botetourt (d. October 15, 1770)
 abeyant until 4 June 1803
 Henry Somerset, 5th Duke of Beaufort, 5th Baron Botetourt (1744 – October 11, 1803)
 Henry Charles Somerset, 6th Duke of Beaufort, 6th Baron Botetourt (1766–1835)
 Henry Somerset, 7th Duke of Beaufort, 7th Baron Botetourt (1792–1853)
 Henry Charles FitzRoy Somerset, 8th Duke of Beaufort, 8th Baron Botetourt (1824–1899)
 Henry Adelbert Wellington FitzRoy Somerset, 9th Duke of Beaufort, 9th Baron Botetourt (1847–1924)
 Henry Hugh Arthur Somerset, 10th Duke of Beaufort, 10th Baron Botetourt (1900–1984)
 abeyant

Co-heirs
The current co-heirs to the barony are the descendants of the elder sister of the tenth baron (tenth Duke of Beaufort):

Descendants of Lady Rosemary Alexandra Eliot (26 Feb 1919-20 Apr 1963) by her first and third marriages:
 (1/4) [daughter of a deceased elder daughter] Mrs Frederica Samantha Mary Thomas, née Cope (b.23 Sep 1963); she has a daughter Davina Mary Mauritius Thomas (b. 1998)
 (1/4) [younger daughter] Mrs. Alexandra Peyronel (b. 1951); she has a son Jesse Peyronel
Elder son of Lady Cathleen Blanche Lily Eliot (29 Jul 1921-1994) by her first marriage:
 (1/2) David Seyfried Herbert, 19th Baron Herbert (b. 1952); his son is Dr. the Hon. Oliver Seyfried Herbert, b.17 Jun 1976 who has a son and two daughters.

References
Citations

Sources

1305 establishments in England
Abeyant baronies in the Peerage of England
Noble titles created in 1305